The 1984–85 Divizia A was the sixty-seventh season of Divizia A, the top-level football league of Romania.

Teams

League table

Results

Top goalscorers

Champion squad

See also 

 1984–85 Divizia B

References

Liga I seasons
Romania
1984–85 in Romanian football